Arlene Stevens (born February 20, 1981) is a retired American epee fencer.  Stevens is lauded as "one of the most decorated fencers in program history," at St. John's University.

NCAA
Stevens competed while attending St. John's University, from 1999-2003.

4 time All-American fencer.

Silver medalist at the NCAA Championships in 2001.

Silver medalist at the Intercollegiate Fencing Association Championships.

US Championships
Stevens won the individual women's épée U.S. National Championship in both 1998 and 1999.

Olympics
Stevens competed in the Olympics at Sydney, Australia, surviving the first round before being defeated by Ildikó Mincza of Hungary.  Stevens was the youngest in the world to qualify for an Olympic fencing team.

Olympic Results

Round 1 - Arlene Stevens (US) def. Zahra Gamir (Algeria) 5-2
Round 2 - Ildikó Mincza (Hungary) def. Arlene Stevens (US) 11-8

Miscellaneous
Stevens is 5'11"

Is left handed

Is of European and Chinese descent.

Also practiced ballet and gymnastics.

See also
 Fencing at the 2000 Summer Olympics

References

External links
 New York Times
 Sports Illustrated
 St. John's University

Living people
American female épée fencers
Olympic fencers of the United States
Fencers at the 2000 Summer Olympics
Sportspeople from New York (state)
1981 births
St. John's Red Storm fencers
21st-century American women
Left-handed fencers